The Moghbazar explosion took place on 27 June 2021 at the wireless gate of Moghbazar in Dhaka, the capital of Bangladesh. At least 7 people were killed and more than 100 injured, out of which 66 were admitted to various hospitals. Police suspect the incident was caused by frozen gas.

Casualties and damage
Hundreds of people were injured in the blast. 6 people were killed. Among the injured, about 66 people are undergoing treatment at the hospital. Most of the injured were from nearby buildings, a few bus passengers and pedestrians.

The three-storey old building on 79 Outer Circular Road on the Mouchak-Magbazar road has partially collapsed. Sounds and blast waves caused by the blast damaged 14 nearby multi-storey buildings. 12 of the buildings are commercial and 2 are residential. In one building was the office of the online news portal 'Aparajey Bangla'. The damaged buildings are: building no. 79 on Outer Circular Road, Rashmono Specialized Hospital, Nazrul School, Arang Showroom, Bishal Center, Dom-Ino Commercial, Best Buy Showroom, Bengal Trades Center, Calcutta Dry Cleaners, Moghbazar Plaza, Hamdard Medical and Sales Center and the Vision Emporium Showroom. The blast also killed three local buses and their occupants.

References

2021 fires in Asia
2021 in Bangladesh
2020s in Dhaka
Disasters in Dhaka
Explosions in 2021
Explosions in Bangladesh
Fires in Bangladesh
June 2021 events in Bangladesh
Building collapses caused by fire
2021 disasters in Bangladesh